Jevon Atkinson is a Jamaican swimmer and Olympian. 

He competed at the 2008 Olympics, finishing 45th in the Men's 50 free.

As of October 2008, he holds the Jamaican Record in the 50 free.

See also
List of Jamaican records in swimming

References
 2008 Olympics profile

1984 births
Living people
Swimmers at the 1999 Pan American Games
Pan American Games competitors for Jamaica
Swimmers at the 2014 Commonwealth Games
Commonwealth Games competitors for Jamaica
Swimmers at the 2004 Summer Olympics
Swimmers at the 2008 Summer Olympics
Olympic swimmers of Jamaica
Jamaican male swimmers
20th-century Jamaican people
21st-century Jamaican people